The National Union of Vehicle Builders (NUVB) was a trade union in the United Kingdom. The NUVB represented a mixture of skilled and unskilled workers in the automotive industry.

History
The union was formed in 1834 as the United Kingdom Society of Coachmakers, adopting the name National Union of Vehicle Builders in 1919.  In 1920, the London and Provincial Coachmakers, the Operative Coachmakers' Federal Union, and the Coachmen and Vicesmiths' Trade Society joined the union, while the Amalgamated Wheelwrights, Smiths and Kindred Trades Union joined in 1923.

In 1934, the union had 20,439 members, divided into 150 branches. The union's increase in dues, was the basis for the 1950 court case Edwards v Halliwell. It merged with the Transport and General Workers' Union (TGWU) in 1972, forming a new automotive trade group within the TGWU.

Election results
The union sponsored Labour Party candidates in several Parliamentary elections.

General Secretaries
1900s: W. J. Clouter
1914: James Nicholson
1935: Harry Halliwell
1953: F. S. Winchester
1962: Alf Roberts
1968: Gabrielis Gallus
1971: Granville Hawley (acting)

See also
 Transport and General Workers' Union
 TGWU amalgamations

References

External links
Catalogue of the NUVB archives, held at the Modern Records Centre, University of Warwick

Defunct trade unions of the United Kingdom
Vehicle industry trade unions
Automotive industry in the United Kingdom
Trade unions established in the 1830s
Trade unions disestablished in 1972
Transport and General Workers' Union amalgamations
Trade unions based in Greater Manchester